St. Cecilia's Convent may refer to:

 St. Cecilia's Convent, Batticaloa, a school in Sri Lanka
 St Cecilia's Convent Secondary School, a school in Malaysia